"Beyond My Control" is a 1991 song recorded by French singer-songwriter Mylène Farmer. It was the fourth single from her third studio album L'autre... and was released in May 1992. The song probably remains well known for its music video that caused controversy and was censored at the time because of its sexual and violent content. It achieved minor success in terms of sales, even though it reached the top ten in France and Belgium.

Background, writing and release

The fickle and ambiguous song "Pas de doute", already scheduled as the third single from the album L'autre..., would have been released as the fourth single, but was finally replaced by "Beyond My Control", which was remixed to be more commercial.

The song was inspired by two characters in the 1782 French epistolary novel Les Liaisons dangereuses, written by Pierre Choderlos de Laclos: the Marquise de Merteuil and the Vicomte de Valmont. In the song, the voice heard on the chorus of the song which repeats "It's beyond my control" is in fact a sample of John Malkovich's voice from the film "Dangerous Liaisons" by Stephen Frears.

For the first time throughout Farmer's career, a CD single was released among the various formats. At the time of the song's release, the radio NRJ prepared a 7" maxi with a collector picture disc in a limited edition (50 units) and containing a new remix.

The song deals with self-control, love, death and the betrayal of the beloved man. Farmer tells her own story from the Valmont's sentence ("it's beyond my control"): that of a woman who kills her unfaithful lover after a night of love.

Music video

The video was directed by Laurent Boutonnat who also wrote the screenplay based on the book "Les Liaisons dangereuses", by Choderlos de Laclos. It was his last video for Farmer before that of "Les Mots", nine years after. The video was shot for two days at Studio Sets in Stains (where the video of "Plus grandir" was already shot in 1985) and cost about only 45,000 euros (the budget was limited because the film Giorgino was in preparation). This Requiem Publishing and Heathcliff SA production features Farmer, Frédéric Lagache, who was the puppeteer in the video of "Sans contrefaçon" and who there plays her flighty lover, and Christophe Danchaud, a dancer of Farmer's tours, who replaces this one for the bare scenes. Photographer Marianne Rosensthiel who witnessed the shooting of the video, said that the white dress worn by Farmer was custom made by a seamstress.

In the video, Farmer, tied on an ignited pyre, tries to struggle. Then she kisses for a long time her lover in torrid scenes, and then, wearing a long and wide dress, she walks on embers, with hands full of blood, while singing. These three scenes continue to intersecting until the end of the video. Then Farmer enters a home and surprises her lover making love with a fair-haired woman. The scenes are very erotic. Farmer bites her lover in the shoulder and some blood trickles along his back; they kiss and some blood flows from their mouths. Two wolves voraciously tear apart the body of a dead man.

The video, with many explicit scenes of sex and violence, was censored from its release, making a great to-do in the mass media which published many controversial images. Polydor proposed to French television host Michel Drucker to broadcast in first the video on his show Champs-Élysées on France 2, but he categorically refused, M6 decided to bill it in full version only after midnight although the Conseil supérieur de l'audiovisuel did not prohibit it, Canal + agreed to broadcast it in the show Top 50, where the programmer confessed she did not find the video so shocking; and for the channel MCM, it asked advice of its television viewers who had voted for or against. Many journalists from various newspapers expressed concerns about the video and French magazine Star Music even qualified it as a "crap". This video was often seen by the general public as a pretext for showing salacious images. However, biographer Bernard Violet believes that the video marked the end of an era in Farmer's career, the era of very sophisticated scenarios, to put more highlight the song. Thus, the video has a narrative framework reduced to its bigger simplicity with short and stripped plans. According to journalist Caroline Beet, the bloody kissing between Farmer and her lover clearly refers to a cannibalistic belief that led primitive people to eat their enemies to feed on their strength. About this video, Farmer explained that she liked the blood and nudity and that her relationships with men were at the time very difficult.

Live performances
"Beyond My Control" was never performed on television. It was only sung during the 2000 Mylenium Tour and thus a recording of the performance is available on the VHS or DVD Mylenium Tour live album; on this occasion, however, Malkovich's voice was replaced and the choreography initially scheduled was abandoned. Farmer wore then orange costume composed of a privateer trousers, a thick jacket and orange shoes, with high heels, and her dancers had different coloured costumes. At the beginning of the song, Farmer asked the audience to clap their hands.

Chart performances
In France, the single started at number ten on 9 May 1992 on the singles chart, reached twice a peak at number eight on 16 May and 6 June, but dropped rather quickly and fell off the top 50 after eleven weeks. The single started at number 21 on the Belgian (Wallonia) Singles Chart and reached number ten four weeks later; it remained for twelve weeks in the top 30. Thus the single chart trajectories and sales were rather disappointing in comparison with the other three singles off L'autre....

Formats and track listings
These are the formats and track listings of single releases of "Beyond My Control":

 7" single – France, Germany

 CD single, cassette, CD single – Promo – France

 CD maxi – France, Germany

 12" maxi – France, Europe

 Digital download

 CD single – Promo – Without case – Canada

 12" maxi – Promo – Picture disc

Release history

Official versions

Credits and personnel
These are the credits and the personnel as they appear on the back of the single:
 Mylène Farmer – lyrics
 Laurent Boutonnat – music
 Requiem Publishing – editions
 Polydor – recording company
 Marianne Rosensthiel – photo
 Henry Neu / Com'N.B – design

Charts and sales

References

Notes

External links
  Mylène Farmer — "Beyond My Control" All about the song, on Mylene.net

1991 songs
1992 singles
Mylène Farmer songs
Songs with lyrics by Mylène Farmer
Songs with music by Laurent Boutonnat
Music videos directed by Laurent Boutonnat
Polydor Records singles
Music based on novels